Sangrecita is a Peruvian cuisine dish of chicken blood. It is seasoned with garlic, onion, chili pepper, herbs and prepared with baked potatoes, fried sweet potatoes or cassava.

Nutrition
Chicken blood contains high amounts of protein and iron, a nutrient important for the prevention of anaemia.

See also

Blood as food

References

Peruvian cuisine